SS Girls is an Italian Nazi exploitation film by director Bruno Mattei. The film is about a brothel where traitors of the Nazi high command are eradicated. To help the brothel out, a Nazi commander, involved in intelligence work, enlists the aid of scientists who train various prostitutes to sexually satisfy the desires of the Nazi high command and root out any traitors.

Synopsis 
Near the end of World War II a German officer selects ten prostitutes to root out the traitors in Hitler's Third Reich. After many orgies and the execution of disloyal officers, the entire company kill themselves upon hearing of Hitler's death.

Partial cast 
 Ivano Staccioli as Oberstgruppenführer Berger
 Luciano Pigozzi as Prof. Jürgen (as Alan Collins)
 Gabriele Carrara as Hans Schellenberg
 Marina Daunia as Frau Inge
 Macha Magall as Madame Eva
 Lucic Bogoliub Benny as Dirlewanger
 Eolo Capritti as Nazi General (as Al Capri)

Style
SS Girls is an example of Naziploitation. This cycle of Nazi sexploitation films are predominantly Italian in origin and emerged for a brief period between 1975 and 1977. In Bruno Mattei's nazi-themed films, the settings are Nazi bordellos and are concerned with staging explicit sexuality.

Production
Parts of the score of SS Girls was from Gianni Marchetti's score for The Last Desperate Hours.

Release
SS Girls passed Italian censorship on January 12, 1977.

References

References

External links

Casa privata per le SS at Variety Distribution
Review at Eccentric Cinema

Italian sexploitation films
1970s Italian-language films
Nazi exploitation films
Films directed by Bruno Mattei
1970s Italian films